Pinares – Las Delicias is a resort (balneario) and southwestern urban extension of the capital of Maldonado Department of Uruguay.

Geography
The resort is located on the coast of the Río de la Plata, just  before its limit with the Atlantic Ocean. Its western limit is the lake Laguna del Diario, to the north it borders the park Chacra Burnett and the suburb Villa Delia, to the northeast the city of Maldonado and to the east Punta del Este.

Population
In 2011 Pinares – Las Delicias had a population of 9,819 and 8,847 dwellings.
 
Source: Instituto Nacional de Estadística de Uruguay

References

External links
 INE map of Maldonado, Villa Delia, La Sonrisa, Cerro Pelado, Los Aromos and Pinares-Las Delicias

Populated places in the Maldonado Department
Seaside resorts in Uruguay